Government Arts College, Karur, is an Autonomous general degree college located in Thanthonimalai Karur, Tamil Nadu. It was established in the year 1966. The college is affiliated with Bharathidasan University and recognized by University Grants Commission(UGC) and Accredited with 'A' Grade by NAAC. This college offers UG, PG, Masters and Doctorate courses in arts, commerce and science.

Departments

Science

Physics
Chemistry
Mathematics
Statistics
Computer Science
Geography
Botany
Zoology
Geology
Nutrition and Dietetics

Arts and Commerce

Tamil
English
History
Economics
Business Administration
Commerce

Accreditation
The college is  Re-accrediated by the National Assessment and Accreditation Council (NAAC) with A Grade

References

External links

Educational institutions established in 1966
1966 establishments in Madras State
Colleges affiliated to Bharathidasan University